Scalabrini Ortiz may refer to:

 Raúl Scalabrini Ortiz, an Argentine writer, journalist, essayist and poet
 Avenida Raúl Scalabrini Ortiz, a road in Buenos Aires
 Scalabrini Ortiz Station, a station on Line D of the Buenos Aires Metro